Ali Hasan Abunimah (born December 29, 1971) is a Palestinian-American journalist who has been described as "the leading American proponent of a one-state solution to the Israeli–Palestinian conflict." A resident of Chicago who contributes regularly to publications such as the Chicago Tribune and the Los Angeles Times, he has served as the vice-president on the board of directors of the Arab American Action Network, is a fellow at the Palestine Center, and is a co-founder of The Electronic Intifada website. He has appeared on many television discussion programs on CNN, MSNBC, PBS, and other networks, and in a number of documentaries about the Israeli-Palestinian conflict, including Collecting Stories from Exile: Chicago Palestinians Remember 1948 (1999).

Early life and education
Born in Washington, D.C., Abunimah spent his early years in the United Kingdom and Belgium before returning to the United States to attend college. His mother is originally from the village of Lifta, now part of Israel, but she became a refugee in the 1948 Palestinian exodus. His father is from the village of Battir, now in the West Bank, and is a former Jordanian diplomat who served as ambassador to the United Nations. According to his friend Max Blumenthal, in an article for the Mondoweiss website, part of the Abunimah family members say their forefathers came from Spain to Palestine following the fall of Granada in 1492.

Abunimah received degrees from Princeton University and the University of Chicago. He began participating in activism while at Princeton. While at the University of Chicago, his work as a researcher for a community-based organization resulted in encounters with that city's Arab community, with which he became actively involved. This in turn brought him in contact with the Arab American Action Network, of which he would later serve as vice president and of which he remains a board member.

Activism

Electronic Intifada
Abunimah is one of the founders of The Electronic Intifada website, a non-profit online publication which covers the Israeli–Palestinian conflict from a Palestinian perspective, which was established in 2001.

Views on Israel and Palestine
In 2009, Abunimah wrote an article entitled, "Israeli Jews and the one-state solution," covering some of the same arguments as he raised in his book, One Country. Abunimah's position is that the two-state solution to the Israeli–Palestinian conflict has "no chance of being implemented" and has been superseded by a "de facto binational state" under Israeli control. He supports the creation of a single democratic state, based on the equality of citizens and taking into account the legitimate concerns of Israel's Jewish population.

Naomi Zeveloff has described Abunimah as "the leading American proponent of a one-state solution to the Israeli–Palestinian conflict, which calls for a shared democratic state from the Mediterranean Sea to the Jordan River. It is a state, in Abunimah's view, in which all residents of Israel and the territories it now occupies would enjoy equal rights and obligations. But in the eyes of his detractors, Abunimah's idea is tantamount to the destruction of the State of Israel, a proposal that would obliterate the Jewish character of the country in favor of majority Arab rule."

Abunimah opposes Zionism, which he describes as "a dying project, in retreat and failing to find new recruits." He argues that Zionism's promotion of Jewish self-determination in Israel and Palestine's "intermixed population" has the effect of maintaining "a status quo in which Israeli Jews exercise power in perpetuity." Abunimah's position is that Palestinians should pursue coercive measures against Israel such as the non-violent Boycott, Divestment and Sanctions (B.D.S.) movement. "Ultimately, I believe," he wrote in January 2012, "the logic and inevitability of a single state will be accepted. As in South Africa and Northern Ireland, any just solution will involve a difficult and lengthy process of renegotiating political, economic and cultural relationships. But that is where the debate, unstoppably, is shifting."

In a post on Electronic Intifada in January 2009, headlined "Why Israel Won't Survive," Abunimah wrote that Israel was created by "the ethnic cleansing of Palestine’s non-Jewish majority Arab population," and "has been maintained in existence only through Western support and constant use of violence to prevent the surviving indigenous population from exercising political rights within the country, or returning from forced exile." Abunimah expressed his belief that the intention of the peace process was to normalize Israel as a Jewish state and gain Palestinian blessing for their own subjugation. He compared Israel to apartheid South Africa, saying Israel makes "South Africa's apartheid leaders look wise, restrained and humane by comparison."

In addition, he also approvingly cites comparisons of Israel to Nazi Germany made by Gerald Kaufman, and has reportedly made them himself. In 2010, he tweeted that "Supporting Zionism is not atonement for the Holocaust, but its continuation in spirit" and has also said "Zionism is one of the worst forms of anti-Semitism in existence today". In his opinion, the Israeli press is comparable to Der Stürmer and IDF statements are the word "of a Nazi" and Gaza is a "ghetto for surplus non-Jews".

He has acknowledged the potential for anti-Jewish violence in Israel should a one-state solution be realized, stating in a Q&A at a 2009 conference at Hampshire College: "You can never have an absolute guarantee about what the future will be like. ... You cannot guarantee that if there was a one-state solution it wouldn't, it would be…the best scenario is if it's more in the direction of South Africa and Northern Ireland than Zimbabwe. But we couldn't rule out, you know, some disastrous situation, like Zimbabwe."

Abunimah has given two theories about the strong relationship between the U.S. and Israel: first, he said Israel plays an important role in U.S. imperialism by allowing it to control the Middle East and their resources; second, he believes "there are powerful organizations and networks that consider support for Israel very important and they influence the politics of the United States through elections and contributions to political campaigns to make candidates adopt to Israel's position."

"The Arab-Zionist conflict did not begin in 1948 but rather long before it," Abunimah maintained in a 2009 lecture. It began, he said, "when the Zionists came to Palestine in the beginning of the last century, and was exacerbated with the appearance of the refugee problem." He made the following argument: "If for example the Jews returned to their original countries, those countries would be shocked, and those are their countries who exported them to Palestine. So how can these countries, most of which sing the praises of democracy and human rights, be silent about the right of return of the Palestinian people, the people and owners of the land, to their villages and cities?" He also claimed that "Zionism is strong, but it has not been renewed or rooted in the land of Palestine, and the Palestinians hold their land and identities dearly and are on their way to a majority."

The Great Book Robbery
In an Electronic Intifada posting dated May 13, 2012, Abunimah praised the documentary film The Great Book Robbery, which "tells the story of the systematic looting in 1948 of tens of thousands of Palestinian books in a joint operation by the Haganah – what became the Israeli army – and the Israeli national library. ... Using eyewitness interviews, secretly shot footage, and historic images, and shots of the books themselves, The Great Book Robbery tells the story of the books and their owners, despite ongoing Israeli official denial.

Gilad Shalit case
Abunimah believed that Gilad Shalit – an Israeli soldier captured in 2006 via cross-border Hamas raid into the Israeli town of Kerem Shalom, released in a prisoner exchange in 2011 – should not have been considered a captive but rather a prisoner of war (POW). As such, he does not believe that Shalit would necessarily be entitled to an ICRC visit or contact with his family – both of which Hamas routinely denied.

Abunimah said that if he were to be considered a POW, his status would fall under the guidelines set forth at the Third Geneva Convention. Under these guidelines, the right of the ICRC to visit prisoners of war is never unconditional, and the ICRC never claims an unconditional right. Abunimah noted that such visits are subject to the measure which the detaining powers consider essential to their security – which is the justification given by Hamas for denying visitation. Allowing visits presents the risk of revealing the location of the Israeli POW, and would run the risk of an Israeli military attack. Hamas would not have been obligated to release any POW until the end of hostilities or until the POW is severely injured or in critical condition.

Joshua Treviño
In an August 2012 article for Al Jazeera headlined "What's gone wrong at The Guardian?", Abunimah criticized the British newspaper's hiring of Joshua Treviño as a political correspondent, calling Treviño "a Republican party operative, paid political consultant and ideologue for hire" with a "propensity to call for violence." His reference was to a June 2011 tweet by Treviño about the Gaza flotilla: "Dear IDF: If you end up shooting any Americans on the new Gaza flotilla – well, most Americans are cool with that. Including me." Responding to this and several other articles and posts by Abunimah about Treviño's hiring, the CiF Watch website cited Abunimah's tweet calling for a "third intifada" as evidence of "selective outrage" and "double standards." The Guardian dropped Treviño shortly thereafter.

The Palestinian Authority
"For years," wrote Abunimah in a December 2012 article for Al Jazeera, "the PA has been equipped and trained under US supervision to act as an auxiliary for Israeli occupation forces to suppress any and all forms of Palestinian resistance, to beat and suppress Palestinians expressing their views and to arrest and harass journalists who dare to criticise it. ... The Abbas PA's record of collaboration with Israel, against the interests of the Palestinian people is long, shameful and well documented. It includes plotting secretly with Israel, the US and the former Mubarak regime in Egypt to overthrow the elected Hamas-led Palestinian Authority after 2006, colluding with Israel to bury the Goldstone report into Israel's war crimes in Gaza in 2008–2009, begging Israel not to release Palestinian prisoners so as not to give credit to Hamas, and more recently Abbas' public renunciation of the Palestinian right of return, a reflection of his longstanding position in negotiations."

West Bank settlements
Debating Jonathan Tobin of Commentary on Democracy Now! in July 2012 about the legality of West Bank settlements, Abunimah argued that Israel's "violent settler colonial enterprise in the West Bank has no international legitimacy" and is "maintained through violence and a system of military tyranny and apartheid." He called the settlements "war crimes," described the IDF as "Israel's Jewish sectarian militia," and spoke of "the Jim Crow-like racism at the core of this Zionist ideology." In answer to Tobin's argument that a necessary first step toward agreement on settlements is Palestinian recognition of Israel's right to exist, Abunimah said: "How can Palestinians ever possibly recognize or give legitimacy to an entity that views their mere reproduction as human beings as a mortal threat?"

Third intifada
Abunimah has publicly supported the idea of a third intifada. On January 20, 2012, he posted on Twitter: "Isn't it the time for a popular Palestinian revolution in the form of a third intifada?" He also supports the Boycott, Divestment, and Sanctions movement, writing in the New Statesman in July 2012 that "Increasingly among Palestinians, the focus is shifting away from statehood towards a discourse on rights. Nowhere is this embodied more succinctly than in the 2005 Palestinian civil society call for boycott, divestment and sanctions on Israel. Without stipulating one state or two, this call demands the end of the Israeli occupation that began in 1967; recognition of the fundamental rights of Palestinian citizens of Israel to full equality; and that any outcome respect, protect and promote the rights of Palestinian refugees to return home."

Gaza Freedom March and Freedom Flotilla I
Abunimah played a key role in the Gaza Freedom March in 2009, a joint effort with Codepink to bring humanitarian relief to Gaza via the Rafah border crossing with Egypt. Though he did not join the later Freedom Flotilla I voyage and was not part of the Free Gaza movement boat projects, Abunimah asserted that the participants in the flotilla had acted peaceably and that they did not intend to kill the IDF soldiers who boarded the ship. Brian Stelter of The New York Times commented in an article on June 1, 2010, that video evidence appeared to contradict Abunimah's account of events on the Mavi Marmara. Among the evidence were two videos which were uploaded by the North American Desk of the Israel Defense Forces (IDF) Spokesperson’s Office on May 31, 2010, and which show flotilla activists on the Mavi Marmara attacking Israeli soldiers attempting to board the ship. However, most of the video footage from passengers had been confiscated by the IDF. Footage that was smuggled out later clearly showed the commandos attacking the passengers.

Abraham Foxman
Abunimah accused Abraham Foxman of the Anti-Defamation League in August 2011 of having influenced the Norwegian mass murderer Anders Behring Breivik: "After Norway, Foxman may fear that the Islamophobic genie he helped unleash is out of control, and is a dangerous liability for him and for Israel."

Criticism of Gilad Atzmon
In March 2012, Abunimah was among those Palestinian activists who signed a statement criticizing the views of Gilad Atzmon as racist and antisemitic. The signatories to the statement called for "the disavowal of Atzmon by fellow Palestinian organizers, as well as Palestine solidarity activists, and allies of the Palestinian people".

Visit to Maghazi camp
Abunimah visited the headquarters of the Popular Committee for Refugees in the Maghazi camp in the Gaza Strip in May 2013. He "expressed his overwhelming joy at being in the camp," saying that the experience "reinforced his spirit of resistance."

Views on Barack Obama
Abunimah met Barack Obama personally in 2004 when the latter was a member of the Illinois State Senate. Abunimah wrote in 2007 that he had met Obama around half a dozen times before Obama held elective office. The events were often at Chicago-based Arab-American and Palestinian events, including a 1998 fundraiser at which Edward Saïd was the keynote speaker. Abunimah has since accused Obama of having cut off his relationships with Arab Americans after his election to the U.S. Senate. "Obama said that he is sympathetic to the Palestinians," Abunimah has declared, "but I do not believe that. ... I believe that he is political and he does not sympathize with the Palestinians in light of his recent positions and actions. He said he was sympathetic to the Palestinians because he needed their votes in order to be elected."

Abunimah has strongly criticized Obama's approach to Mid-East affairs, writing that the president has "entrenched" the policies of his predecessor, George W. Bush, and has not contributed to "even the pretense of a serious peace effort." A 2007 article in New York's Jewish Week reported that Palestinian activist and Israel critic Rashid Khalidi had held an Obama fundraiser in his home when Obama was running for the House of Representatives, and quoted Abunimah as saying that Obama “convinced me he was very aware of the issues [and] critical of U.S. bias toward Israel and lack of sensitivity to Arabs....He was very supportive of U.S. pressure on Israel.'"

Abunimah said on the TV and radio program Democracy Now! in 2008 that he had known Barack Obama "for many years as my state senator—when he used to attend events in the Palestinian community in Chicago all the time." Abunimah added that he had introduced Obama in 1999 at a "community fundraiser for the community center in Deheisha refugee camp in the occupied West Bank. And that's just one example of how Barack Obama used to be very comfortable speaking up for and being associated with Palestinian rights and opposing the Israeli occupation," Abunimah said. In May 2012, Abunimah wrote that the United States under Obama was leading a campaign "to close every door to justice for Palestinians," and that his ambassador to the United Nations, Susan Rice is leading "a relentless anti-Palestinian crusade at the UN." He also wrote that "the Susan Rices and William Hagues of the world are not only silent about these crimes, but fully complicit in them," referring to the Palestinian hunger strikers in Israeli prisons.

Published work
Abunimah wrote the book One Country: A Bold Proposal to End the Israeli-Palestinian Impasse, which proposes to revive the idea of one state shared by two peoples. Booklist wrote that "Abunimah's approach, inspired by ongoing reconciliation processes in South Africa (and, to a lesser extent, Northern Ireland), is fresh, energetic, and ultimately optimistic that those tired of violence will eventually gravitate toward an inclusive, unified Israel." The International Socialist Review called the book "refreshing" and concluded that "In the struggle for liberation, we must never lose sight of what we are ultimately fighting for, no matter how far off it may seem. When many others have moved away from this discussion, Ali Abunimah's book refocuses it on the right goal, even if he's not clear about the path from here to there." The Arab Studies Journal, noting that "any book proposing a one-state solution to the Zionist-Palestinian conflict" faces major challenges, such as "how to propose a vision of a shared future without papering over the history of injustice" and "how to instill hope without succumbing to naivete," said that Abuminah "navigates these challenges admirably."

In response to the Gaza War Abunimah wrote an article in The Guardian headlined: "We have no words left". In the article, Abunimah commented about the end of the truce: "But what is Israel's idea of a truce? It is very simple: Palestinians have the right to remain silent while Israel starves them, kills them and continues to violently colonise their land" and "any act of resistance including the peaceful protests against the apartheid wall in the West Bank is always met by Israeli bullets and bombs. There are no rockets launched at Israel from the West Bank, and yet Israel's extrajudicial killings, land theft, settler pogroms and kidnappings never stopped for a day during the truce." Abunimah said on the TV and radio program Democracy Now! in 2008 that he had known Barack Obama "for many years as my state senator—when he used to attend events in the Palestinian community in Chicago all the time." Abunimah added that he had introduced Obama in 1999 at a "community fundraiser for the community center in Deheisha refugee camp in the occupied West Bank. And that's just one example of how Barack Obama used to be very comfortable speaking up for and being associated with Palestinian rights and opposing the Israeli occupation," Abunimah said.

Articles by Abunimah on the Palestinian issue have been published by The New York Times, the Los Angeles Times, The Guardian, Al Jazeera and other publications.

References

 One Country: A Bold Proposal to End the Israeli-Palestinian Conflict

External links

 Electronic Intifada Official Website
 Abunimah.org Official Website
 Palestine Center
 Profile on Ali Abunimah at The Institute for Middle East Understanding
Ali Abunimah on Opening of US-Brokered Mideast Peace Talks – video report by Democracy Now!
 

1971 births
Living people
American online journalists
American people of Palestinian descent
American political activists
American journalists of Arab descent
Anti-Zionism in the United States
Activists from Washington, D.C.
Princeton University alumni
University of Chicago alumni